Andrei Ivanovich Manannikov (born 5 August 1965) is a Tajikistani professional football coach and a former player.

Club career
He made his professional debut in the Soviet First League in 1982 for FC Pamir Dushanbe.

Career statistics

International

Statistics accurate as of 30 October 2015

Honours
Pamir Dushanbe
Tajikistan Higher League (1): 1992

References

1965 births
Sportspeople from Dushanbe
Tajikistani people of Russian descent
Living people
Soviet footballers
Tajikistani footballers
Tajikistan international footballers
Association football goalkeepers
CSKA Pamir Dushanbe players
PFC CSKA Moscow players
FC Zenit Saint Petersburg players
FC Rotor Volgograd players
FC Anzhi Makhachkala players
FC Metallurg Lipetsk players
FC Dynamo Saint Petersburg players
FC Sheksna Cherepovets players
Soviet Top League players
Soviet First League players
Soviet Second League players
Tajikistan Higher League players
Russian Premier League players
Russian First League players
Russian Second League players
Tajikistani expatriate footballers
Expatriate footballers in Russia
Tajikistani expatriate sportspeople in Russia
Tajikistani football managers
Tajikistani expatriate football managers
Expatriate football managers in Russia
Expatriate football managers in Latvia
Tajikistani expatriate sportspeople in Latvia